The Pithapur Rajah's Government College, is autonomous institution located in Kakinada, Andhra Pradesh, India. It has been recognized as the 'College with Potential for Excellence' by the University Grants Commission in 2010.

History
The College was established in 1884 by Sri Rajah Rao Venkata Mahipathi, Gangadhara Rama Rao, Bahadur. Initially, it was started as a middle school in 1853, and became a full-fledged College under the Madras University.

Academic Programmes
The college offers undergraduates and postgraduate programmes in arts and science affiliated to the Adikavi Nannaya University. It has been accredited by NAAC with an A Grade (CGPA 3.17).

References

External links
 

Colleges in Andhra Pradesh
Education in Kakinada
Educational institutions established in 1884
1884 establishments in India
Academic institutions formerly affiliated with the University of Madras